The ancient Egyptian noble Amenmose lived in Thebes during the reigns of Amenhotep III.  He was buried in a tomb in Sheikh Abd el-Qurna, part of the Theban Necropolis.

References

People of the Eighteenth Dynasty of Egypt